Some Mother's Boy is a 1929 American silent drama film directed by Duke Worne and starring Mary Carr, Jason Robards Sr. and Jobyna Ralston.

Synopsis
When two young tearaways are fleeing from the scene of a crime one is shot and the other escapes. He makes his way to the home of his companion's mother, who recognizes him as the son she has been separated from for fifteen years.

Cast
 Mary Carr as The Mother
 Jason Robards Sr. as The Boy 
 Jobyna Ralston as The Girl
 M.A. Dickinson as The Son
 Henry A. Barrows as The Salesman

References

Bibliography
 Munden, Kenneth White. The American Film Institute Catalog of Motion Pictures Produced in the United States, Part 1. University of California Press, 1997.

External links
 

1929 films
1929 drama films
1920s English-language films
American silent feature films
Silent American drama films
Films directed by Duke Worne
Rayart Pictures films
1920s American films
English-language drama films